North Dakota's 3rd congressional district is an obsolete congressional district in the state of North Dakota that was created by reapportionments in 1913, and eliminated by the reapportionments of the 1930 census in 1933. The district consisted of the western part of the state, and was made up of following counties: Divide, Burke, Renville, Ward, Mountrail, Williams, McKenzie, McLean, Dunn, Mercer, Oliver, Billings, Stark, Morton, Hettinger, Bowman and Adams.

The seat only was only filled by two congressmen during its existence; Patrick Daniel Norton and James H. Sinclair.

List of members representing the district

Election results

References

 Congressional Biographical Directory of the United States 1774–present
Congressional Quarterly's Guide to U.S. Elections, Fourth Edition (CQ Press, 2001)

03
Former congressional districts of the United States